For the 2000 ISSF World Cup in the seventeen Olympic shooting events, the World Cup Final was held in October 2000 in Nicosia, Cyprus for the shotgun events, and in November 2000 in Munich, Germany for the rifle, pistol and running target events.

Shotgun
The winners in Nicosia were:
  Michael Diamond, Australia, in men's Trap
  Li Bo, China, in men's Double Trap
  Petr Málek, Czech Republic, in men's Skeet
  Gao E, China, in women's Trap
  Zhang Yafei, China, in women's Double Trap
  Olga Ponarina, Russia, in women's Skeet

Rifle, pistol and running target
The winners in Munich were:
  Jozef Gönci, Slovakia, in men's 50 m Rifle Three Positions
  Sergei Martynov, Belarus, in men's 50 m Rifle Prone
  Artem Khadjibekov, Russia, in men's 10 m Air Rifle
  Franck Dumoulin, France, in men's 50 m Pistol
  Ralf Schumann, Germany, in men's 25 m Rapid Fire Pistol
  Tan Zongliang, China, in men's 10 m Air Pistol
  Manfred Kurzer, Germany, in men's 10 m Running Target
  Shan Hong, China, in women's 50 m Rifle Three Positions
  Sonja Pfeilschifter, Germany, in women's 10 m Air Rifle
  Lalita Yauhleuskaya, Belarus, in women's 25 m Pistol
  Tao Luna, China, in women's 10 m Air Pistol

ISSF World Cup
World Cup
2000 in German sport
2000 in Cypriot sport
2000s in Munich
20th century in Nicosia
Sports competitions in Munich
Sport in Nicosia
Shooting competitions in Cyprus
Shooting competitions in Germany
October 2000 sports events in Europe